Customs House Hotel may refer to:

 Newcastle Customs House in New South Wales, Australia
 Customs House Hotel, Maryborough in Queensland, Australia